SS Minnewaska was a 21,716-ton ocean liner in the service of the Atlantic Transport Line and the Red Star Line from 1923–1933

She was the fourth ship of the Atlantic Transport Line to carry the name "Minnewaska". The third Minnewaska had been launched in 1908 and sailed the London to New York City route until 1915 when she was requisitioned by the British Army with disastrous consequences. In 1916, she struck a mine in Souda Bay, Crete, in the Mediterranean sea. With 1,800 troops on board and badly damaged, she was beached and written off as a total loss. Her replacement, the fourth SS Minnewaska, in 1923, had accommodation for 369 first class passengers, but was primarily a cargo carrier, the largest afloat at 21,716 tons. She cost the Atlantic Transport Line £1,175,000. SS Minnewaska and her sister ship SS Minnetonka were the largest ships to use London Docks prior to the P.& O. "Strath" ships.

Minnewaska was laid down at the Harland & Wolff Ltd, shipyard, Belfast, Northern Ireland, in 1923 and completed on 25 August 1923. She began her maiden voyage from London to New York on 1 September 1923 under the control of Captain T. F. Gates. In 1924, Captain Gates was transferred to the Minnetonka and the Minnewaska was under the command of Captain F. H. Claret.

Two years later, Minnewaska was involved in another collision, with Traffic's sister ship . By 1932, the Atlantic Transport Line’s business was severely affected by the Depression and all of its ships were either laid up or disposed of. The Minnewaska was laid up in Southend on Sea in 1931, the last ship to carry the Atlantic Transport Line’s colours before being sold to the Red Star Line. She made her first Red Star voyage, Antwerp-New York City, on 13 May 1932. By the autumn of 1933, she was no longer needed by Red Star. Her last Atlantic crossing was in September 1933, and she was sold for scrap along with her sister ship Minnetonka to Messrs Douglas & Ramsey, ship-breakers, for £35,000 in 1934. Minnewaska and Minnetonka had been in service barely ten years, among the shortest careers of any major Atlantic liner.

References

Ships built in Belfast
Passenger ships of the United Kingdom
Steamships
Ocean liners
1923 ships
Ships built by Harland and Wolff